The Claymont Stone School, also known as Naaman's Creek School #1, is a historic schoolhouse built in 1805, on land donated by Founding Father John Dickinson, in Claymont, Delaware, on the Philadelphia Pike just south of the Darley House. The school was listed in the National Register of Historic Places in 1990. Its  official Delaware State Historic Marker indicates that the school "may have been the first racially integrated public school in the State."

The original building was renovated in 1905 and expanded to become a two-room schoolhouse, serving the neighborhood of Claymont and the rural Naaman's Creek area as a school until the 1924–25 school year, when the Green Street School was built.

In 1928 the Stone School was converted to serve as a community center and public library, but in 1988 it was deemed structurally unsound. Thereafter, it stood empty, and the school district considered tearing it down until a group called Friends of the Claymont Stone School intervened to save the building, raising funds for its renovation and conversion into a museum and heritage center, which was completed in 2002.

References

External links 
 Claymont Stone School Website
 Preservation Online article

Educational institutions established in 1805
School buildings on the National Register of Historic Places in Delaware
Schoolhouses in the United States
Schools in New Castle County, Delaware
Stone school buildings
1805 establishments in Delaware
National Register of Historic Places in New Castle County, Delaware
Stone buildings in the United States